This list of 2017 motorsport champions is a list of national or international motorsport series with championships decided by the points or positions earned by a driver from multiple races where the season was completed during the 2017 calendar year.

Open wheel racing

Sports car and GT

Touring cars

Rallying

Motorcycle racing

Dirt racing

Road racing

Stock car racing

Dirt oval racing

Truck racing

Drifting

Air racing

Radio-controlled racing

1:10 Off-Road

See also
 List of motorsport championships

References

Champions
2017